P. dianthi may refer to:

 Peronospora dianthi, a plant pathogen
 Phyllosticta dianthi, a sac fungus